Aamhi Satpute  (transl. We Are Seven Brothers) is a 2008 Indian Marathi-language comedy-drama film directed and produced by Sachin Pilgaonkar. It stars Sachin Pilgaonkar, Supriya Pilgaonkar, Swapnil Joshi, Amruta Sant and Ashok Saraf in lead roles. The film is based on Satte Pe Satta (1982) and Seven Brides for Seven Brothers (1954).

Plot

Cast 

 Sachin Pilgaonkar as Mukunda Satpute (Kaandya)
 Supriya Pilgaonkar as Annapurna Bhosle-Satpute (Purna)
 Ashok Saraf as Annasaheb Bhosle (Annapurna's father)
 Swapnil Joshi as Chingalya Satpute (Kaandya's youngest brother)
 Amruta Sant as Chime  (Chingalya's girlfriend)
 Kedar Shirsekar as Batatya Satpute
 Bhagyashree Rane as Batatya's girlfriend 
 Nayan Jadhav as Tambya Satpute
 Mrunali Mayuresh as Tambya's girlfriend 
 Vrishasen Dabholkar as Harbharya Satpute
 Hemlata Bane as Harbharya's girlfriend
 Sachin Kulkarni as Dodkya Satpute
 Anita Chandrakant as Dodkya's girlfriend   
 Ananda Karekar as Kobya Satpute
 Swati Deval as Kobya's girlfriend
 Atul Parchure as Chandya (Annasaheb's friend)
 Nirmiti Sawant as Doctor (Cameo Appearance) 
 Anand Abhyankar as Jailor (Cameo Appearance)

Production and Release 

Before the release, Sachin commented that the movie was not a remake of Satte Pe Satta (1982), but instead was an adaptation of English film Seven Brides for Seven Brothers (1954). He said that Satte Pe Satta had a crime angle, while this film is a musical comedy. About the title, Sachin said, "Satpute is a common Marathi surname, and since the film has seven brothers, I thought it was an apt name for the film." 
Tata Motors tied up with the film to promote Tata Ace mini-trucks.

The film was released in theaters in Maharashtra on 18 April 2008.

Soundtrack 
The movie soundtrack has 7 songs and was released by Video Palace. Jitendra Kulkarni produced the music and lyrics were penned by Pravin Davane. Singers include Sonu Nigam, Shankar Mahadevan, Nihira Joshi, Rajendra Salunkhe, Vibhavaree Apte-Joshi, Vaishali Samant, and Sachin.

References

Additional References

External links
 
 

2008 films
2000s Marathi-language films
Marathi remakes of Hindi films
Films directed by Sachin (actor)